A bounty hunter is an individual who seeks out fugitives for a monetary reward.

Bounty hunter(s) may also refer to:

TV and film
 The Bounty Hunter (1954 film), a Western film starring Randolph Scott
 The Bounty Hunter (2010 film), a comedy film starring Gerard Butler and Jennifer Aniston
 Bounty Killer (film), a 2013 action film starring Matthew Marsden and Kristanna Loken
 Dog the Bounty Hunter, a reality television show
 Bounty Hunters (American TV series), an American animated television series
 Bounty Hunters (British TV series), a British comedy-drama series
 "The Bounty Hunter" (K-9), an episode of K-9
 "The Bounty Hunter" (My Name Is Earl), a first-season episode of My Name Is Earl
 "Bounty Hunters" (Star Wars: The Clone Wars), a second-season episode of Star Wars: The Clone Wars"
 Bounty Hunters (1996 film), an American-Canadian film
 Bounty Hunters (2005 film), an American TV movie
 Bounty Hunters (2016 film), a Chinese-South Korean-Hong Kong film

Gaming
 Mace Griffin: Bounty Hunter, a 2003 first person shooter on the PlayStation 2, Xbox, and PC
 Star Wars: Bounty Hunter, a 2002 Star Wars video game developed and published by LucasArts
 A former activity in the MMORPG RuneScapeOther uses
 Bounty Hunter (truck), a monster truck currently racing in the USHRA Monster Jam series
 Star Wars: The Bounty Hunters'', a series of four one-shot comics
 "Bounty Hunter," a song by Southern rock band Molly Hatchet
 VFA-2 "Bounty Hunters", a United States Navy squadron
 Another term for a contract killer